Robin Hudson may refer to:

Robin E. Hudson (born 1952), American jurist
Robin Lyth Hudson (born 1940), British mathematician